Pennasolis is a genus of checkered beetles in the family Cleridae. There are at least three described species in Pennasolis.

Species
These three species belong to the genus Pennasolis:
 Pennasolis californica (Van Dyke, 1923)
 Pennasolis merkeli (Horn, 1896)
 Pennasolis opitzi Rifkind, Toledo & Corona, 2010

References

Further reading

 
 

Cleridae
Articles created by Qbugbot